The Staver and Staver-Chicago was an American Brass Era  automobile manufactured at 76th and Wallace Streets in Chicago, Illinois, by the Staver Carriage Company from 1906 until 1914.

History 
Staver Carriage Company was organized after the 1896 bankruptcy of the Staver-Abbott Carriage Company,  by Henry C. Staver in 1899.  In 1905 Staver began an expansion of their carriage factory and also began developing a high-wheel automobile that would be introduced in late 1906.  Henry C. Staver died in 1907 and his son Harry B. Staver became president of Staver Carriage Company.

The company's initial Staver automobile was an 18/20-hp high wheeler, with a stanhope body.  Larger, more powerful and more expensive at $1,000 than most high-wheelers, it was fully equipped with top, side curtains, storm front, lights and toolbox. As Models C and D, it debuted at the 1907 Chicago Auto Show and approximately 200 were sold into 1908.

Production was turned over to conventional automobiles with a two-cylinder 20-hp roadster in 1909 and four-cylinder models beginning in 1910.  Staver purchased 500 American & British Manufacturing Company four-cylinder engines designed by Charles F. Herreshoff.  Poor manufacturing resulted in a lawsuit that lasted until 1914.  Teetor engines from the Light Inspection Car Company designed for Staver, were used from 1910.  In 1912, Dan C. Teetor became chief designer for Staver until 1914.

With the introduction of the 4-cylinder automobiles, Staver's were advertised as Staver-Chicago models.  Staver became very active in motorsports and reliability runs and participated in the Elgin National Road Races, Algonquin Hill Climb, Chicago's 1,400 mile Reliability Run, many board races and culminating in the Around Lake Michigan runs in 1911 and 1912.  Gus Monckmeier, Chester Cheney, Emery Knudsen, Harry L. Curran and Ralph Ireland were all drivers for Staver.  Ralph Ireland died in a practice run when his Staver-Chicago burst a tire at Elgin.  Munckmeier had a perfect score for Staver in the 1911 Around Lake Michigan trial, but was later suspended along with Staver from AAA events for a year, when it was found the winning Staver-Chicago car was not stock.  

For 1912 Staver-Chicago was dropped and all cars were again advertised as Staver.  Staver's were mid-priced in the $1,650 to $2,250 range with limousines priced up to $3,500.   

1914 Models were introduced early in March 1913 and included the new six-cylinder Staver of 70-hp, priced as a touring car at $2,750, .  Production for cars ended in June 1914, and carriages later in the year.  Staver Carriage Company continued as a property company for a few years, leasing the Staver factory to Partin Manufacturing Company and other automobile manufacturers.  The factory and automobile equipment transferred to Studebaker in 1917 in a property swap.

Models

Production 
Production figures total 7,092 vehicles. 

About five Staver vehicles still exist.

Advertisements

References

External links
 1909 Staver Model ER RM Southbys
 DPL Digital Collection - Staver Carriage Company
 Hemmings article - The Staver Carriage Company

1900s cars
1910s cars
Brass Era vehicles
Highwheeler
Motor vehicle manufacturers based in Illinois
Defunct motor vehicle manufacturers of the United States
History of Chicago
Defunct companies based in Chicago
Defunct companies based in Illinois
Vehicle manufacturing companies established in 1906
Vehicle manufacturing companies disestablished in 1914
1899 establishments in Illinois
1914 disestablishments in Illinois
Cars introduced in 1906